Mankovice is a municipality and village in Nový Jičín District in the Moravian-Silesian Region of the Czech Republic. It has about 600 inhabitants.

History
The first written mention of Mankovice is from 1374.

During the German occupation (World War II), the occupiers operated the E119 forced labour subcamp of the Stalag VIII-B/344 prisoner-of-war camp at a local sawmill.

Notable people
Matthäus Stach (1711–1787), German Moravian missionary
Karl Gilg (1901–1981), German chess player

References

Villages in Nový Jičín District